The Bangladesh Army Special Warfare Wing (SWW) is an institution for training Special Forces.

Established in 1976 as the Special Warfare School, in 1982 it was reorganized under the army's Central Training Institute as the Special Warfare Wing of the School of Infantry and Tactics in Jalalabad Cantonment, Sylhet.

Organization

The Special Warfare Wing (SWW) falls under the control of the Bangladesh Army Training and Doctrine Command as a school open to most members of the Bangladesh Army. Students come from units in the Bangladesh Army, Air Force, Navy, Border Guards, Coast Guard, and select foreign military services.

Training 
Most courses are held at Sylhet. Training in the Sylhet Phase occurs in and around Sylhet Cantonment. Training at the Mountain Phase is conducted at the Chittagong Hill Tracts and in the mountains near Sylhet. The Chittagong Phase is conducted at various locations near Chittagong Cantonment, Bangladesh Military Academy, Hathazari firing range, and Battle Inoculation Range, Chittagong.

History
The Bangladesh Army has a history of special forces operations, dating to the guerrilla warfare practices of the Mukti Bahini, during the 1971 Bangladesh Liberation War. In 1976, a unique warfare school was established at Chittagong Cantonment and relocated to Sylhet Cantonment in 1979. Army commando course and counter-insurgency course began in 1980, and in 1982 the school was reorganized as the Special Warfare Wing of the Bangladesh Army School of Infantry and Tactics (SI&T).

The Bangladesh Army Sniper Team placed 7th in the 2017 International Army Games in Kazakhstan. In 2018, they placed 5th at the competition in Belarus.

See also
 School of Infantry and Tactics
 Para-Commando Brigade (Bangladesh Army)
 Bangladesh Army Airborne School

References

Special forces of Bangladesh
Bangladesh Army
Bangladesh Armed Forces education and training establishments